In golf, a hole in one or hole-in-one (also known as an ace, mostly in American English) occurs when a ball hit from a tee to start a hole finishes in the cup. A ball hit from a tee following a lost ball, out-of-bounds, or water hazard is not a hole-in-one due to the application of a stroke penalty.

Holes-in-one most commonly occur on par 3 holes, the shortest distance holes on a standard size golf course. Longer hitters have also accomplished this feat on longer holes, though nearly all par 4 and par 5 holes are too long for golfers to reach in a single shot. While well known outside golf and often requiring a well hit shot and significant power, holes in one need also a significant element of luck. As such, they are more common and considered less impressive than other hole accomplishments such as completing a par 5 in two shots (an albatross). , a condor (four under par) hole-in-one on a par 5 hole had been recorded on five occasions, aided by thin air at high altitude, or by cutting the corner on a doglegged or horseshoe-shaped hole.

Rarity
Holes-in-one are rare and, although skill increases the probability, there is a great element of luck involved. It is traditional for a player who has scored a hole-in-one to buy a round of drinks for everyone at the clubhouse bar.

Time magazine reported 1,200 holes in one were made by American golfers in 1922.

A memorable hole-in-one was made in the 1973 Open Championship by Gene Sarazen at age 71. Earl Dietering of Memphis, Tennessee, 78 years old at the time, is believed to hold the record for the oldest person to make a hole-in-one twice during one round.

During the second round of the 1971 Martini International tournament, held at the Royal Norwich Golf Club in England, John Hudson had two consecutive holes-in-one. Teeing off, using a 4-iron, at the par-three, 195-yard 11th hole, Hudson holed his tee shot for a hole-in-one. At the next hole, the downhill 311-yard, par-four 12th, and this time using a driver, he once again holed his tee shot, for another ace. This is believed to be the only time a player has scored holes-in-one at consecutive holes in a major professional tournament.

Despite the relative rarity of holes-in-one, there have been a total of six in Ryder Cup matches. Peter Butler scored the first in 1973 at Muirfield followed by a 20-year gap before Nick Faldo scored a hole-in-one in 1993. Two years later, Costantino Rocca and Howard Clark both scored holes-in-one before an 11-year gap to 2006 saw Paul Casey and Scott Verplank both hole out in one on the 14th hole.

On August 11, 2016, Justin Rose shot a hole-in-one during the first round of the golf tournament of the 2016 Summer Olympics in Rio de Janeiro, which is considered to be the first in Olympic history. For the 189 yards par-3 hole, he used a 7-iron.

Competitions
Occasionally special events host a hole in one contest, where prizes as expensive as a new car, or cash awards sometimes reaching $4 million are offered if a contestant records a hole in one. Usually such expensive prizes are backed by an insurance company who offers prize indemnification services. Actuaries at such companies have calculated the chance of an average golfer making a hole in one at approximately 12,500 to 1, and the odds of a tour professional at 2,500 to 1.

Holes-in-one on par 5 (or higher) holes
As of January 2021, a condor (four under par) hole-in-one on a par-5 hole had been recorded on five occasions. A horseshoe-shaped par 5 hole once enabled a condor hole-in-one to be achieved with a 3-iron club. Another may have been achieved at the former Piedmont Crescent Golf Course in 1973 after bouncing multiple times on a very firm fairway due to unseasonably dry weather. The longest recorded straight drive hole-in-one is believed to be , on the par-5 No. 9 hole at Green Valley Ranch Golf Club in Denver in 2002, aided by the thin air due to the high altitude. None of the five par-5 holes-in-one were achieved during a professional tournament. A condor is also known as a double albatross, or a triple eagle.

See also
 Golf glossary
 Hail Mary pass, similar feat in American football
 List of longest NBA field goals, (all of which are buzzer beaters) for context on the similar feat in basketball

References

External links
 Hole-In-One FAQs United States Golf Association

Golf terminology
Perfect scores in sports